The Sobey School of Business is the business school of Saint Mary's University (SMU), located in Halifax, Nova Scotia, Canada. Originally established in 1934 as the Saint Mary's University Faculty of Commerce, the program was one of the first business programs in Canada. The school is consistently ranked as one of the top business schools in Canada. Most recently, Quacquarelli Symonds (QS) placed Sobey's MBA program in the top ten in Canada. In November, 2018, Corporate Knights placed the Sobey MBA at number 8 in its Better World MBA ranking. It is the most comprehensive business school in Atlantic Canada. In 1992, the Faculty of Commerce was renamed the Sobey School of Business after Frank H. Sobey, the founder of Empire Company Limited and Sobeys. The Sobey School of Business offers a well-respected Bachelor of Commerce program, with a wide range of specialties, including entrepreneurship, finance, accounting, computing and information systems and human resource management and industrial relations. The School also provides a range of graduate-level programs including a Master of Business Administration, a Master of Finance, a Master of Applied Economics, a Master of Technology Entrepreneurship and Innovation, and a well-respected Ph.D. program. Also under the Sobey School's umbrella are executive and professional development courses and the Saint Mary's University Entrepreneurship Centre.

The Sobey Building on the Saint Mary's University campus was built in 2000 and has been regularly updated since then. It houses offices, meeting rooms, the BComm Advising Centre, the Sobey Math Help centre and classrooms. The bright, modern building, along with the joined Loyola building, host most of the School's classes, along with computer labs, faculty and administration offices, seminar rooms, research spaces, Doctoral student offices and separate student lounges for graduate and B.Comm students. Executive education facilities are housed in suites at the Halifax World Trade and Convention Centre, located in the core of downtown Halifax, Nova Scotia. The School has an campus located at BNUZ in Zhuhai, China, where a Sobey BComm in Finance program is offered to about 100 students per year.

Accreditations & Recognition

Association to Advance Collegiate Schools of Business (AACSB) 
The Sobey School of Business is accredited by The Association to Advance Collegiate Schools of Business (AACSB) International. Less than 5 percent of business schools worldwide (about 20 in Canada) have earned this accreditation, the highest standard in management education.

Ranking
Quacquarelli Symonds (QS) placed Sobey's MBA program in the top ten in Canada.
Corporate Knights' ranked the Sobey MBA number 8 in the world in their Better World MBA ranking (2018), placing Sobey above MIT, Harvard and Stanford.
Canadian Business ranked the Sobey MBA 8th in Canada and best in Atlantic Canada for 2015.

Beta Gamma Sigma
The Sobey School of Business is a member of Beta Gamma Sigma. Beta Gamma Sigma is the honour society serving business programs accredited by AACSB International. Membership in Beta Gamma Sigma is the highest recognition a business student can receive in a business program accredited by AACSB International. Only five other Canadian Business Schools have attained membership in Beta Gamma Sigma.

EFMD
The Sobey School of Business is a member of EFMD, formerly the European Foundation for Management Development.

Degree Programs—Undergraduate 
The Sobey School of Business offers a range of business degrees, starting with a Bachelor of Commerce with 10 major options or specializations. 

 Accounting
 Computing and Information Systems
 Economics
 Entrepreneurship
 Finance
 General Business Studies (Custom-Design)
 Global Business Management
 Honours Economics
 Human Resource Management and Industrial Relations
 Management
 Marketing

Certificate Programs
 Human Resource Management

Admission - Undergraduate 
Admission to the undergraduate level is competitive. The Bachelor of Commerce program requires the completion of grade 12 English academic, Mathematics 11 and 12 or Advanced Mathematics 11 and 12 or Pre Calculus 12 or Calculus 12 and three additional academic grade 12 courses. Students are also required to hold a minimum 70% (applicants usually hold an average of high 70s to low 90s to be admitted to the program) coming from high school with no mark less than 60% required in the above courses.

Degree Programs—Graduate 
The Sobey School of Business offers graduate and doctorate level programs, including
 Ph.D. in Business Administration
 MBA program with focus areas in Finance; Management Consulting; Entrepreneurship, Social Enterprise and Sustainability; Marketing. 
 MBA (CPA Stream)
 Master of Management, Co-operatives and Credit Unions
 Graduate diploma in Co-operative Management
 Master in Finance  
 Master of Technology Entrepreneurship and Innovation
 Master of Applied Economics

Notable alumni
 Robert P. Kelly – CEO of The Bank of New York Mellon (Former)
 Wilfred P. Moore – Canadian Senator, Nova Scotia

References

 

Saint Mary's University (Halifax)
Business schools in Canada